James Douglas Hall (born 19 October 1988) is an English-born Irish cricketer. He is a right-handed batsman and a right-arm off-break bowler. Hall started his career in 2005 playing for Ireland's Under-17s team in Division One of the European Under-17 Championship, though after playing three matches in this competition, he moved up to the Under-19s, for whom he later played in the ICC Under-19 World Cup.

Hall is a lower-order batsman and a steady bowler with one four-wicket innings in youth one-day international cricket thus far.

External links
 James Hall at Cricket Archive 

1988 births
Irish cricketers
Ireland One Day International cricketers
Living people
British emigrants to Ireland